The People is a 1972 television film, broadcast as an ABC Movie of the Week on January 22, 1972. It is primarily based on "Pottage", a novella by Zenna Henderson, with elements of Henderson's stories "Araret", "Gilead" and "Captivity." It stars Kim Darby, William Shatner, Diane Varsi, Laurie Walters, and Dan O'Herlihy. Darby and Shatner had previously appeared together in the Star Trek episode "Miri."

Plot summary
This science fiction film tells the story of Melodye Amerson (Kim Darby), a young teacher who goes to a remote area to work with a group of individuals who have isolated themselves from civilization and maintained an independent community, vaguely similar to the Amish or a religious commune. Melodye is unnerved by the secretive behavior of her students, and the fact that all fun, games and activities she proposes are forbidden to them. Valancy (Diane Varsi), an elder in the community, advises Melodye to stay, because she senses that things are about to change in the valley, and Melodye herself is a part of that change.

Melodye soon discovers that the secluded and "backwards" residents are actually aliens with mild paranormal powers. A natural disaster destroyed their planet, and they are hoping to establish a life on Earth. Landing in the late 1800s, initially they shared their secret with local residents, but found themselves condemned as witches. Many were killed, and the survivors forbade their children ever to use their abilities, even with extreme discretion. Young adults like Valancy (and even some of the older people) have been pushing for an end to these restrictions.

Cast
Kim Darby--Melodye Amerson 
William Shatner--Dr. Curtis 
Diane Varsi--Valancy Carmody 
Dan O'Herlihy--Sol Diemus 
Laurie Walters--Karen Diemus
Johanna Baer--Bethie

Production
As noted above, the film was notable for its second pairing of William Shatner and Kim Darby, who had worked together in the Star Trek episode "Miri."

The children's illustrations in the film were done by Arthur Okamura. 

The film was the first TV movie for John Korty, and was produced by his sometime partner Francis Ford Coppola, listed as the Executive Producer on the actual film, and scored by his father Carmine.

Reception 
One history of science fiction reports that the film stood out in its time "for being neither shoddy nor sentimentalized."

References

External links

1972 films
1972 drama films
1970s science fiction films
1970s English-language films
ABC Movie of the Week
1972 television films
American science fiction television films
Films scored by Carmine Coppola
1972 directorial debut films
1970s American films